Sabitri Agarwalla is an Indian politician from Odisha. She was elected as the MLA from Patkura constituency in 2019. Sabitri is from Biju Janta Dal and defeated congress candidate Jayanta Mohanty and BJP candidate Bijay Mohapatra, winning by 17, 920 votes.

References 

Odisha politicians
Biju Janata Dal politicians
Year of birth missing (living people)
Living people
Odisha MLAs 2019–2024